Beach soccer at the 2015 Mediterranean Beach Games in Pescara took place from 2 to 6 September 2015 at the Arena del Mare. One event took place, the men's tournament.

The event was organised in cooperation with Beach Soccer Worldwide (BSWW).

Hosts Italy won the gold medal.

Medalists

Participating teams
Twelve teams took part in the first edition of beach soccer at the Mediterranean Beach Games. 

The draw to split the twelve teams into three groups of four took place on 18 July.

Group stage
Key

All times are local, CEST (UTC+2).

Group A

Group B

1. Egypt were found to have breached BSWW regulations in their match against Turkey, and were therefore deducted 2 points

Group C

Placement matches

9th–12th place play-offs
All fourth placed teams plus the worst ranked third place team contested 9th through 12th place.

Semi-finals

11th place match

9th place match

5th–8th place play-offs
Worst and second best runners-up plus the best and second best third place teams contested 5th through 8th place.

Semi-finals

7th place match

5th place match

Knockout stage

Semi-finals

Bronze medal match

Final – Gold medal match

Final standings

References

External links
Beach soccer Pescara 2015, at Pescara 2015 Official website (archived, in Italian)
Mediterranean Beach Games Pescara 2015, at Beach Soccer Worldwide
Mediterranean Beach Games 2015, at beachsoccerrussia.ru (in Russian)

2015
2015 in beach soccer